The Scenic Trail is an international skyrunning competition held for the first time in 2013. It runs every year in Lugano (Switzerland) in June. The race was valid in 2017 for the Skyrunner World Series.

Races
 Scenic Trail M100 Hyper, an Ultra SkyMarathon (167 km / 11,560 m vertical climb)
 Scenic Trail K113 Ultra, an Ultra SkyMarathon (119 km / 7,600 m vertical climb)
 Scenic Trail K54 Trail, a SkyMarathon (54 km / 3,650 m vertical climb)
 Scenic Trail K27 Skyrunning, a SkyRace (27 km / 2,200 m vertical climb)
 Scenic Trail K18 Walking, a not competitive mini SkyRace (18 km / 1150 m vertical climb)
 Scenic Trail K4 VK, a Vertical Kilometer (4.5 km / 880 m vertical climb)

Results

See also 
 Skyrunner World Series

References

External links 
 [scenictrail.ch Official web site]

Skyrunning competitions
Skyrunner World Series
Trail running competitions
Athletics competitions in Switzerland
Lugano